Uma Maheswarar Temple of Konerirajapuram in the Mayiladuthurai district in the South Indian state of Tamil Nadu, is a historical temple dedicated to Shiva. Shiva is worshiped as Uma Maheswarar, and is represented by the lingam and his consort Parvati is depicted as Mattuvar Kuzhalammai. The presiding deity is revered in the 7th century Tamil Saiva canonical work, the Tevaram, written by Tamil saint poets known as the nayanars and classified as Paadal Petra Sthalam.

Originally built by the Cholas, it was later renovated by the Madurai Nayaks and Vijayanagara rulers. The major complex in the temple are believed to be built during the 8th century by the Chola king Aditya I and his grandson Raja Raja Chola I.

The temple has six daily rituals at various times from 6:00 a.m. to 12 pm and 5 p.m. to 9 p.m., and twelve yearly festivals on its calendar. The Chittirai festival during the Tamil month of Chittirai (April - May) is celebrated for fifteen days, portraying the various incidents associated with the temple legend. The temple is maintained and administered by the Hindu Religious and Endowment Board of the Government of Tamil Nadu.

Temple
The presiding deity is Shiva. The goddess is Angavala Nayaki. Hymns in praise of the temple have been composed by Campantar and Thirunavukkarasar. There are also shrines to Brahma and Vishnu within the complex. There are also shrines for Ganesha and Murugan as Vaidyanathaswami.

History 
The present temple was constructed in the 10th century AD by Sembian Mahadevi, grandmother of Raja Raja Chola I.

Paintings and Sculptures 
This temple is famous for its beautiful paintings found in the front mandapa and the miniature sculptures found outside the sanctum sanctorum of the presiding deity.

Worship and festivals
The temple priests perform the pooja (rituals) during festivals and on a daily basis. Like other Shiva temples of Tamil Nadu, the priests belong to the Shaivaite community, a Brahmin sub-caste. The temple rituals are performed six times a day; Ushathkalam at 5:30 a.m., Kalasanthi at 8:00 a.m., Uchikalam at 10:00 a.m., Sayarakshai at 6:00 p.m., Irandamkalam at 8:00 p.m. and Ardha Jamam at 10:00 p.m. Each ritual comprises four steps: abhisheka (sacred bath), alangaram (decoration), neivethanam (food offering) and deepa aradanai (waving of lamps) for both Uma Maheswarar and Mattuvar Kuzhal Amman. The worship is held amidst music with nagaswaram (pipe instrument) and tavil (percussion instrument), religious instructions in the Vedas  read by priests and prostration by worshippers in front of the temple mast. Abhishekam is done to Lord Nataraja 6 times in a year. Maasi, Avani, Puratasi on Valarpirai Chathurtasi thithi days, and Chithirai Thiruvonam, Aani Uthram, Marghazi Thiruvathirai star days  The temple is counted as one of the temples built on the banks of River Kaveri.

References

Gallery

Paintings

Miniature Sculptures

Shiva temples in Mayiladuthurai district
Padal Petra Stalam